Uedem is a municipality in the district of Cleves, in North Rhine-Westphalia, Germany. It is located near the border with the Netherlands.

Division of the town
Uedem consists of 4 districts
 Uedem
 Uedemerfeld
 Keppeln
 Uedemerbruch
 Brunzenhausen

History
 5th century Frankish nobleman Odo/Udo started settlement in the area
 866 first official mentioning as "odeheimero marca"
 1359 gained town privileges
 1359 liberation out of the dependency towards Xanten – "Treaty Of Xanten"
 1794–1814  French occupation
 1798 loss of town privileges
 World War II heavily destroyed (85%) in several air raids as well as ground operation

Notable people 
 Hermann Gröhe (born 1961), politician (CDU)

References

External links

Kleve (district)